King Munyaradzi Nadolo (born 4 December 1995) is a Zimbabwean footballer who plays as a midfielder for Dynamos F.C. and the Zimbabwe national football team.

Career

Club
Nadolo began his senior career with Highlanders F.C. in his native Zimbabwe, breaking into the senior squad in 2014. By 2016, Nadolo had attracted attention from abroad, going on trial in South Africa.

Two years later, Nadolo made a move to South Africa, signing with National First Division club Witbank Spurs. He made his competitive debut for the club on 3 February 2018, coming on as a 68th-minute substitute for Peter Mubayiwa in a 2-1 home victory over Real Kings F.C. After less than a year with the club, and after making just four league appearances, Nadolo returned to Zimbabwe, signing with Telone F.C.

In February 2020, Nadolo joined Dynamos Harare.

International
Nadolo made his senior international debut on 13 June 2016, coming on as a 76th-minute substitute for Charlton Mashumba in a 0-0 draw with Madagascar at the 2016 COSAFA Cup. He was named in the Zimbabwe squad for the 2020 African Nations Championship, playing all three group matches as Zimbabwe exited in the group stages.

References

External links

1995 births
Living people
Highlanders F.C. players
Witbank Spurs F.C. players
Dynamos F.C. players
National First Division players
Zimbabwe Premier Soccer League players
Zimbabwean footballers
Zimbabwe international footballers
Association football midfielders
Zimbabwean expatriate footballers
Zimbabwean expatriate sportspeople in South Africa
Expatriate soccer players in South Africa
Zimbabwe A' international footballers
2020 African Nations Championship players